The hedgehog leaf-toed gecko (Hemidactylus echinus) is a species of gecko. It is found in Central Africa (Cameroon, Democratic Republic of the Congo, and Gabon, although the latter is disputed).

References

Hemidactylus
Geckos of Africa
Reptiles of Cameroon
Reptiles of the Democratic Republic of the Congo
Reptiles of Gabon
Reptiles described in 1875
Taxa named by Arthur William Edgar O'Shaughnessy